Route 10 is a trunk route in the Hong Kong Strategic Route and Exit Number System. It is a  dual carriageway with three lanes in each direction, consisting of the Kong Sham Western Highway (formerly Deep Bay Link) and the Shenzhen Bay Bridge of the Hong Kong–Shenzhen Western Corridor, connecting the Yuen Long Highway (Route 9) in Lam Tei to Shenzhen via the Shenzhen Bay Port border checkpoint. The entire highway forms part of Asian Highway 1, although the Asian Highway Network is not signed in Hong Kong.The trunk route is the only one in Hong Kong that terminates at a border crossing, and also the only trunk route that is partly built outside of Hong Kong, the in Shenzhen Municipality.

At one stage, the Hong Kong Government had proposed to build the Yuen Long-Lantau and the Lantau-Hong Kong Island sections of Route 10. This plan was superseded by the Tuen Mun-Chek Lap Kok Link and the planned Route 11. As of mid-2010, various alignments for the Tuen Mun Western Bypass were being considered with ongoing consultation with the Yuen Long and Tuen Mun District Councils, Heung Yee Kuk and relevant rural committees.

Exit list

References and external links

AH1
 
Routes in Hong Kong